The Worshipful Company of Poulters is one of the Livery Companies of the City of London. In 1368, the organisation received the power to regulate the sale of poultry, swans, pigeons, rabbits and small game. The company, which was incorporated under a Royal Charter in 1665, is no longer an association of tradesmen that retains its ancient powers, but now operates as a charitable institution as do most of the other Livery Companies.
	
The Poulters' Company ranks thirty-fourth in the order of precedence of Livery Companies. Its motto is Remember Your Oath.

External links
The Poulters Company website

Poulters
1368 establishments in England